European American Armory Inc. is a Rockledge, Florida based firearms company which imports a number of different handguns, shotguns and rifles to the United States.

Products

The company is best known
 for importation of the Tanfoglio T95 as the "Witness" line of pistols. The Witness is a modified clone of the Czech CZ-75/CZ-85 pistol. It is made in Gardone Val Trompia (Brescia), Italy by Fratelli Tanfoglio S.N.C.

EAA also imports the Arminius HW-357 as the EAA-Arminius Windicator and the Western Single Action.

External links
 Official Company Website

References

Firearm importation companies of the United States